Syngamia eos is a moth in the family Crambidae. It was described by Herbert Druce in 1902. It is found in Cameroon, the Democratic Republic of the Congo (Kasai-Oriental), Madagascar and Zambia.

References

Moths described in 1902
Spilomelinae